Asuridoides is a genus of moths in the subfamily Arctiinae. The genus was erected by Franz Daniel in 1951.

Species
 Asuridoides atuntseica Daniel, 1951
 Asuridoides osthelderi Daniel, 1951

References

External links

Lithosiini
Moth genera